Tales of the City is a series of novels by Armistead Maupin.

Related to the Maupin novels
 Tales of the City (novel), 1978 novel, first in the series
 Tales of the City (1993 miniseries), 1993 television adaptation
 More Tales of the City (novel), 1980 novel
 More Tales of the City (miniseries), 1998 television adaptation
 Further Tales of the City (novel), 1982 novel
 Further Tales of the City (miniseries), 2001 television adaptation
 Tales of the City (2019 miniseries), a revival series for Netflix, based on later novels in Maupin's series
 Armistead Maupin's Tales of the City, a 2011 musical with music by Jake Shears

Other
 Tales of the City (album), a 1988 album by Rockmelons
 Tales of the City (Obverse Books), a 2012 City of the Saved anthology